The boy's Modern pentathlon competitions at the 2010 Summer Youth Olympics in Singapore were held on August 22, 2010 at the Singapore Sports School.

Only the fencing, swimming, shooting and running portions were done at the Youth Olympics.  The results of each of the four segments of the modern pentathlon were converted into points scores based on a par value of 1000 points per event. Competitors doing better than par would receive more points. At the end of the first two segments, the points would be calculated and the pentathletes would be handicapped for the final segment based on their scores such that a simultaneous finish in that segment would result in identical overall scores.

The first segment was one touch épée, the second was 200 metre freestyle swimming and the final segment was combined running and shooting where athletes ran a total of 3000 metres and shot using the laser pistol.

Medalists

Results

References
 Fencing
 Swimming
 Running & Shooting

Modern pentathlon at the 2010 Summer Youth Olympics